The following television stations operate on virtual channel 65 in the United States:

 KKPX-TV in San Jose, California
 KTFN in El Paso, Texas
 WDMW-LD in Milwaukee, Wisconsin
 WEDY in New Haven, Connecticut
 WLJC-TV in Beattyville, Kentucky
 WPDN-LD in Pittsburgh, Pennsylvania
 WRBW in Orlando, Florida
 WUPV in Ashland, Virginia
 WUVI-LD in West Lafayette, Indiana
 WUVP-DT in Vineland, New Jersey

References

65 virtual